Sonya Sones is an American poet and author. She has written seven young adult novels in verse, and one novel in verse for adults. The ALA has named her one of the most frequently challenged authors of the 21st century. In 2004, 2005, 2010, and 2011, the ALA included her novel What My Mother Doesn't Know on their list of the Top Ten Most Challenged Books, and it was named 31st on the ALA's list of the Top 100 Banned/Challenged Books of the 2000s.

Biography
She was born in Boston, Massachusetts and currently lives in Southern California. After graduating from Hampshire College, she taught filmmaking at Harvard University; her other jobs have included baby clothes designer, animator, photographer, and film editor. Her style differs from most contemporary writers in that her novels are told in verse form rather than prose. This means that they are a series of poems which, when read in order, tell a story. Sones is married to screenwriter Bennett Tramer, of Saved by the Bell. The two of them co-wrote a picture book, Violet and Winston, in 2009. It is illustrated by 2006 Caldecott Medal winner Chris Raschka.

Writing

The American Library Association has named several of her novels Best Books for Young Adults, as well as Quick Picks for Reluctant Young Adult Readers. Her debut novel, Stop Pretending: What Happened When My Big Sister Went Crazy won numerous awards, including a Christopher Award, the Claudia Lewis Award for Poetry, the Myra Cohn Livingston Poetry Award, and a nomination for a Los Angeles Times Book Prize. In 2004, One of Those Hideous Books Where the Mother Dies was chosen a Popular Paperback by the ALA and received a Cuffie Award from Publishers Weekly for the Best Book Title of the Year. Her fourth book, What My Girlfriend Doesn't Know, was published by Simon & Schuster in June, 2007. It is the sequel to What My Mother Doesn’t Know, and picks up right where the other story leaves off, only it's told from Robin's point of view. It received a starred review from Booklist and was named a Booklist Top Ten Romance, a New York Public Library Book for the Teen Age, a Bank Street Best Book of the Year, and a Books-A-Million Teen Book Club selection.

Her first novel in verse for adults, The Hunchback of Neiman Marcus, was published by Harper Collins in April 2011, and made the Los Angeles Times Bestselling Paperbacks list. It is about "a writer way behind on her deadline whose fiftieth birthday is rushing at her like a freight train," and deals with issues related to going through menopause, adjusting to an empty nest, and caring for aging parents. The film rights to The Hunchback of Neiman Marcus were optioned by actress Michelle Pfeiffer.

Sones' fifth novel in verse for young adults, To Be Perfectly Honest (A Novel Based on an Untrue Story), was published by Simon & Schuster in August 2013. It was nominated as a Best Book for Young Adults by YALSA. Sones' sixth novel in verse, Saving Red, received a starred review from Booklist.

Sones' seventh novel in verse for young adults, The Opposite of Innocent, is a Junior Library Guild selection, and was named one of Barnes & Noble's Most Anticipated Contemporary YA Novels of 2018. Gayle Forman, bestselling author of If I Stay, called it "a wonderful novel and an important #MeToo conversation starter.Sones has participated in multiple panel discussions at the annual Los Angeles Times Festival of Books. She was the moderator on the panel "Young Adult Fiction: Teens and Turmoil" with Gayle Forman, Jandy Nelson and Cynthia Kadohata during the 2010 event. She has also presented at the ALA, the National Council of Teachers of English, the International Reading Association, the Society of Children's Book Writers and Illustrators, and at numerous schools and literary festivals around the country and abroad. Sones' novels have been published in eight different languages.

List of works

Young adult novels in verseStop Pretending: What Happened When My Big Sister Went Crazy (HarperCollins 1999)What My Mother Doesn't Know (Simon & Schuster 2001)One of Those Hideous Books Where the Mother Dies (Simon & Schuster 2004)What My Girlfriend Doesn't Know (Simon & Schuster 2007)To Be Perfectly Honest (Simon & Schuster 2013)Saving Red (HarperTeen 2016)The Opposite Of Innocent (HarperTeen 2018)In the History LessonAdult novels in verseThe Hunchback of Neiman Marcus (HarperCollins 2011)

Short stories in verse
Short stories in verse are included in numerous anthologies, including:Love and Sex (2001) - a story called Secret ShelfNecessary Noise (2003) - a story called Dr. Jekyll and Sister HydeSixteen: Stories About that Sweet and Bitter Birthday (2004) - a story called Cat Got Your TonguePicture booksViolet and Winston'' (Dial 2009) - written along with husband Bennett Tramer and illustrated by Chris Raschka

References

External links
 

Living people
20th-century American novelists
21st-century American novelists
Writers from Boston
American children's writers
Hampshire College alumni
Harvard University faculty
Year of birth missing (living people)
American women poets
American young adult novelists
American women children's writers
American women novelists
Women writers of young adult literature
Novelists from Massachusetts
20th-century American women writers
American women academics
21st-century American women writers